Hamady Tamboura (born 23 June 1989) is a French professional footballer who plays for Athlético Marseille. Tamboura previously played for Angers, where he made five appearances in Ligue 2.

References

External links

1989 births
Living people
People from Mantes-la-Jolie
French footballers
French people of Malian descent
FC Mantois 78 players
Angers SCO players
SO Romorantin players
USL Dunkerque players
US Boulogne players
Les Herbiers VF players
Athlético Marseille players
Ligue 2 players
Championnat National players
Championnat National 2 players
Championnat National 3 players
Association football midfielders
Footballers from Yvelines